343158 Marsyas (prov. designated ) is an asteroid on a retrograde orbit, classified as a large near-Earth object of the Apollo group. It may be an extinct comet or damocloid asteroid. The asteroid was discovered on 29 April 2009, by astronomers with the Catalina Sky Survey at the Catalina Station near Tucson, Arizona, in the United States. Approximately  in diameter, it makes many close approaches to Earth, Venus, and Mars at a very high relative velocity. It was named after the satyr Marsyas from Greek mythology.

Classification and orbit 

Marsyas was initially listed as a potentially hazardous asteroid. It was removed from the Sentry Risk Table on 6 May 2009. It orbits the Sun at a distance of 0.49–4.6 AU once every 4.02 years (1,467 days; semi-major axis of 2.53 AU). Its orbit has an eccentricity of 0.81 and an inclination of 154° with respect to the ecliptic.

Retrograde 

Marsyas has a retrograde orbit and thus orbits the Sun in the opposite direction of other objects. Therefore, close approaches to this object can have very high relative velocities. , it had the highest relative velocity to Earth of objects that come within 0.5 AU of Earth.

Close approaches 

Both Halley's Comet (254,000 km/h) and 55P/Tempel-Tuttle (252,800 km/h) have slightly lower relative velocities to Earth.
Note however that when the asteroid is one astronomical unit from the sun (as it would be if it ever hit the earth), its relative speed will be less. On 2 February 2053, Marsyas will pass about 0.08 AU from Venus.

Possible damocloid 

The multiple planet crossing and retrograde orbit suggests that this object may be an extinct comet or damocloid asteroid similar to 5335 Damocles, and 20461 Dioretsa.

Possible asteroid origin 

Marsyas has a semimajor axis that puts it very near the 3:1 mean-motion resonance with Jupiter at 2.5 au. This resonance has been shown to be a source for near-Earth asteroids on low-inclination orbits to evolve onto retrograde orbits. Studies show that, when compared to model predictions, Marsyas exhibits orbital behavior very similar to near-Earth asteroids that undergo the transition to retrograde orbits. Its orbital evolution and current location very near the 3:1 resonance strongly suggests that Marsyas thus may likely to be a near-Earth asteroid that evolved onto a retrograde orbit as opposed to being an extinct comet or damacloid asteroid.

Diameter 

Based on a generic magnitude-to-diameter conversion, Marsyas measures approximately 1.7 to 3.5 kilometers in diameter, for an absolute magnitude of 16.2 and an assumed albedo between 0.22 and 0.05.
Since the true albedo is unknown and it has an absolute magnitude (H) of 16.1, it is about 1.6 to 3.6 km in diameter.

Naming 

On 14 May 2021, the object was named by the Working Group Small Body Nomenclature (WGSBN), after Marsyas, a Phrygian satyr from Greek mythology, who dared to challenge Apollo in a musical contest. Marsyas lost and he was flayed alive in a cave near Celaenae for his hubris to challenge a god. As with the mythological account, the unusual retrograde orbit of asteroid Marsyas is opposed to most bodies in the Solar System, including 1862 Apollo.

References

External links 
 2009 news images at HohmannTransfer.com
 List Of Apollo Minor Planets (by designation), Minor Planet Center
 
 
 

343158
343158
343158
Named minor planets
343158
20090429